Richard Hutchison (January 20, 1812 – September 27, 1891) was a New Brunswick businessman and political figure. He represented Northumberland in the House of Commons of Canada as a Liberal member from 1868 to 1872.

He was born in Renfrewshire, Scotland in 1812, the son of David Hutchison. He was educated there and came to New Brunswick in 1826. In 1840, Hutchison married Elizabeth Mackie. He was a lumber merchant in  the Glasgow-based firm Gilmour, Rankin & Co (a branch of Pollok, Gilmour and Company) which operated on the Miramichi River; by 1852, he was the sole resident partner and he was given control of the operation in 1870. Hutchison represented Northumberland County in the Legislative Assembly of New Brunswick from 1864 to 1866. He was elected to the House of Commons in an 1868 by-election held after the death of John Mercer Johnson.

His son Ernest later represented Northumberland in the Legislative Assembly of New Brunswick.

Electoral record

References 

1812 births
1891 deaths
Liberal Party of Canada MPs
Members of the House of Commons of Canada from New Brunswick
People from Renfrewshire
People from Northumberland County, New Brunswick
People from Miramichi, New Brunswick
Scottish emigrants to pre-Confederation New Brunswick